Provincial elections were held in Argentina on 3 October 1993, alongside parliamentary elections.

Corrientes

Governor

Deputies

Senate

References 

Provincial elections in Argentina
1993 in Argentina